Pogwizdów may refer to the following places in Poland:
Pogwizdów, Lower Silesian Voivodeship (south-west Poland)
Pogwizdów, Silesian Voivodeship (south Poland)
Pogwizdów, Bochnia County in Lesser Poland Voivodeship (south Poland)
Pogwizdów, Miechów County in Lesser Poland Voivodeship (south Poland)
Pogwizdów, Subcarpathian Voivodeship (south-east Poland)